Patrick Farrell may refer to:

 Patrick Farrell (fencer), Canadian Olympic fencer
 Patrick Farrell (police officer) (1909–?), Garda officer
 Patrick Farrell (footballer) (1872–1950), Irish international footballer
 Patrick Farrell (photojournalist) (born 1959), American photojournalist
 Patrick Farrell (rugby league), Canadian rugby league player for Canada national rugby league team
 Paddy Farrell (born 1913), Irish footballer

See also

Pat Farrell (disambiguation)
Patrick O'Farrell (1933–2003), Irish historian